Vanguard was a 32-gun galleon of the English Tudor navy, launched in 1586 from Woolwich, and was the first ship of the navy to bear the name.

She played a key part in the action against the Spanish Armada in 1588.

George Beeston anchored the ship in the Forth at Leith on 1 June 1589. One of his crew was killed ashore in Edinburgh in a fight with Spanish sailors. 

She was commanded by Martin Frobisher in 1594 and by Sir Robert Mansell in 1596.

She was taken to pieces in 1599 and rebuilt for the first time. In 1615 she was rebuilt for a second time, at Chatham, as a great ship.

During actions against Algerian pirates in 1620, Vanguard flew the flag of Sir Richard Hawkins.

Vanguard was broken up in 1630. Some of her timbers were used in the construction of the next , launched the following year, and officially recorded as a rebuild of the first Vanguard.

Notes

References
Citations

Bibliography

Lavery, Brian (2003) The Ship of the Line - Volume 1: The development of the battlefleet 1650-1850. Conway Maritime Press. .

Ships of the English navy
16th-century ships
Ships built in Woolwich